Anjir Baghi (also Romanized as Anjīr Bāghī; also known as Enjīl Bāghī and Injil Bāqi) is a village in Sardaran Rural District, in the Central District of Kabudarahang County, Hamadan Province, Iran. At the 2006 census, its population was 224, in 52 families.

References 

Populated places in Kabudarahang County